This is part of a list of Statutes of New Zealand for the period of the Fourth National Government of New Zealand up to and including part of the first year of the Fifth Labour Government of New Zealand.

1990s

1991 
 Animal Control Products Limited Act 
 Building Act  Amended: 1992/93/96/2002/03/05
 Business Development Boards Act  Amended: 1996/97
 Child Support Act  Amended: 1992/93/94/96/97/98/99/2001/03/05/06
 Crown Minerals Act  Amended: 1991/93/96/97/2003/04
 Driftnet Prohibition Act  Amended: 2000
 Electoral Referendum Act 
 Employment Contracts Act  Amended: 1991
 Foreshore and Seabed Endowment Revesting Act  Amended: 1994/99
 Harbour Boards Dry Land Endowment Revesting Act 
 Invercargill Reserves Vesting and Empowering Act 
 Kumeu District Agricultural and Horticultural Society Act 
 Legal Services Act  Amended: 1992/94/95/97/2001/03/06/07
 Marlborough District Council Empowering Act 
 Ministry of Maori Development Act 
 New Zealand Permanent Trustees Limited Act 
 New Zealand Planning Council Dissolution Act 
 New Zealand Tourism Board Act 
 Orakei Act 
 Privacy Commissioner Act 
 Proceeds of Crime Act  Amended: 1992/2002
 Resource Management Act 1991  Amended: 1993/94/96/97/2003/04/05/07
 Sugar Loaf Islands Marie Protected Area Act 
Plus 113 Acts amended and 2 Acts repealed.

1992 
 Accident Rehabilitation and Compensation Insurance Act  Amended: 1992/93/95/96/97/98
 Crown Research Institutes Act 
 Energy Companies Act  Amended: 1992/93
 Health and Safety in Employment Act  Amended: 1993/98/2002/04/06
 Housing Restructuring Act 
 Industry Training Act  Amended: 1993/2002/03
 Lake Pukaki Water Level Empowering Act 
 Measurement Standards Act 
 Mines Rescue Trust Act 
 Museum of New Zealand Te Papa Tongarewa Act  Amended: 1996
 Mutual Assistance in Criminal Matters Act  Amended: 1994/96/98/99/2001/02
 National War Memorial Act 
 New Zealand Export-Import Corporation Dissolution Act 
 Northland Regional Council and Far North District Council Vesting and Empowering Act 
 Otago Foundation Trust Board Act  Amended: 1968/86
 Railway Safety and Corridor Management Act 
 Selwyn Plantation Board Empowering Act 
 Ship Registration Act  Amended: 1999/2005
 Southland Flood Relief Committee Empowering Act 
 Student Loan Scheme Act  Amended: 1993/95/96/97/98/99/2000/03/05/07
Plus 105 Acts amended and 3 Acts repealed.

1993  

 Air Facilitation Act 
 Animal Identification Act  Amended: 1999
 Biosecurity Act  Amended: 1993/94/96/97/99/2003/04/05/07
 Birdlings Flat Land Titles Act 
 Cancer Registry Act 
 Canterbury Area Health Board Reserves and Other Lands Empowering Act 
 Citizens Initiated Referenda Act  Amended: 1994/95
 Companies Reregistration Act  Amended: 1994/97/98
 Consumer Guarantees Act  Amended: 1999/2003
 Earthquake Commission Act  Amended: 1998
 Estate Duty Abolition Act 
 Films, Videos, and Publications Classification Act  Amended: 1997/98/99/2005/07
 Financial Reporting Act  Amended: 1994/96/97/2001/04/06
 Health and Disability Services Act  Amended: 1995/98
 Housing Assets Transfer Act 
 Human Rights Act  Amended: 1994/99/2001/04/07
 Land Transport Act  Amended: 1995/97/2004/05/06/07
 Maritime Transport Act  Amended: 1996/98/99/2000/04/05
 Ngati Rarua-Atiawa Iwi Trust Empowering Act 
 Privacy Act  Amended: 1993/94/96/97/98/2000/02/03/05/06/07
 Receiverships Act  Amended: 1994/2001/05
 Retirement Income Act 
 Southland Electricity Act 
 Takeovers Act  Amended: 2001/02/06
 Te Ture Whenua Maori Maori Land Act 
Plus 106 Acts amended and 1 Act repealed.

1994  

 Arts Council of New Zealand Toi Aotearoa Act 
 Clevedon Agricultural and Pastoral Association Empowering Act 
 Countrywide Banking Corporation Limited Act 
 Fiscal Responsibility Act  Amended: 1998
 Geographical Indications Act  Amended: 1996
 Health and Disability Commissioner Act  Amended: 2003/07
 Income Tax 001 Act 
 Income Tax 002 Act 
 Insurance Intermediaries Act 
 Layout Designs Act  Amended: 1999
 National Bank of New Zealand Limited Act 
 New Zealand Sports Drug Agency Act  Amended: 2000
 Tax Administration Act  Amended: 1995/96/97/2005/06
 Taxation Review Authorities Act  Amended: 1996
 Veterinarians Act 
Plus 137 Acts amended and 4 Acts repealed.

1995  

 Births, Deaths, and Marriages Registration Act  Amended: 1997/2000/01/02/03
 Chatham Islands Council Act  Amended: 2002/04
 Domestic Violence Act  Amended: 1998/2003
 International War Crimes Tribunals Act 
 Radio New Zealand Act  Amended: 2004
 St Kentigern Trust Act 
 Waikato Raupatu Claims Settlement Act 
Plus 75 Acts amended and 1 Act repealed.

1996  

 Auckland War Memorial Museum Act 
 Customs and Excise Act  Amended: 1996/98/2000/01/02/04/06/07
 Dog Control Act  Amended: 2003/04/06
 Financial Transactions Reporting Act  Amended: 1998/99
 Hazardous Substances and New Organisms Act  Amended: 1999/2000/03/07
 Inspector-General of Intelligence and Security Act 
 Institute of Chartered Accountants of New Zealand Act 
 Intelligence and Security Committee Act 
 New Zealand Antarctic Institute Act 
 Te Runanga o Ngai Tahu Act 
 United Nations Convention on the Law of the Sea Act 
Plus 129 Acts amended and 1 Act repealed.

1997  

 Agricultural Compounds and Veterinary Medicines Act  Amended: 1998/99/2000/02/03/07
 Compulsory Retirement Savings Scheme Referendum Act 
 Credit (Repossession) Act 1997
 Finance Act 
 Harassment Act 
 Meat Board Act  Amended: 2006
 Trans-Tasman Mutual Recognition Act 
 Waitutu Block Settlement Act 
 Wool Board Act 
Plus 75 Acts amended

1998  

 Accident Insurance Act  Amended: 1999/2000
 Anti-Personnel Mines Prohibition Act 
 Crown Pastoral Land Act 
 Electricity Industry Reform Act  Amended: 2001/04
 Farmers' Mutual Group Act 
 Kirkpatrick Masonic Trust Empowering Act 
 Land Transport Act
 Mental Health Commission Act  Amended: 2007
 Ngai Tahu Claims Settlement Act 1998  Amended: 2005
 Public Service Investment Society Limited Act 
 Rating Valuations Act 
 University of Hawke's Bay Trust Board Dissolution and Vesting Act 
Plus 83 Acts amended and 2 Acts repealed.

1999  

 Animal Products Act  Amended: 2002/05/07
 Animal Welfare Act 1999  Amended: 2000/01/02/05
 Apple and Pear Industry Restructuring Act  Amended: 2001
 Children's Health Camps Board Dissolution Act 
 Community Trusts Act 
 Courts Security Act 
 Dairy Industry Restructuring Act  Amended: 2005/07
 Department of Child, Youth and Family Services Act 
 Kiwifruit Industry Restructuring Act 
 Maritime Crimes Act 
 New Zealand Railways Staff Welfare Society Dissolution Act 
 Ngati Turangitukua Claims Settlement Act  Amended: 2003
 Nuclear-Test-Ban Act 
 Personal Property Securities Act  Amended: 2000/01/04/05/07
 Stamp Duty Abolition Act 
 Veterans' Affairs Act 
 Year 2000 Information Disclosure Act 
Plus 99 Acts amended and 3 Acts repealed.

See also 
The above list may not be current and will contain errors and omissions. For more accurate information try:
 Walter Monro Wilson, The Practical Statutes of New Zealand, Auckland: Wayte and Batger 1867
 The Knowledge Basket: Legislation NZ
 New Zealand Legislation Includes some Imperial and Provincial Acts. Only includes Acts currently in force, and as amended.
 Legislation Direct List of statutes from 2003 to order

Lists of statutes of New Zealand